Dharmayudham is a 1973 Indian Malayalam film, directed by A. Vincent. The film stars Prem Nazir, Srividya, Kaviyoor Ponnamma and Adoor Bhasi in the lead roles. The film had musical score by G. Devarajan.

Cast
Prem Nazir as Kochaniyan
Nanditha Bose (dubbed by KPAC Lalitha)
Srividya as Sridevi
Kaviyoor Ponnamma
Adoor Bhasi
P. J. Antony
Paravoor Bharathan
Bahadoor
Kottarakkara Sreedharan Nair
S. P. Pillai
Rony Vincent
Philomina as Narayani
 Oduvil Unnikrishnan as  Avarachan

Soundtrack
The music was composed by G. Devarajan and the lyrics were written by P. Bhaskaran and G. Kumarapilla.

References

External links
 

1973 films
1970s Malayalam-language films
Films directed by A. Vincent